Marzi Pestonji (born 30 October 1979), fondly known as Udi Baba (a positive surprise), also popularly known as Master Marzi, is an Indian dancer and choreographer. He was one of the judges of Zee TV’s reality dance show 
Dance India Dance (DID) along with Geeta Kapoor and Terence Lewis on Zee TV. He recently judged Season 7 of Nach Baliye and Dance India Dance (season 6).

Pestonji is currently judging Dance Deewane Juniors (season 1), and recently performed at IKF in Milpitas, California along with a talented group of local dancers. He is a member of Shiamak Davar‘s dance team and has been working with him for over 20 years. He has choreographed many music videos for various movies.

References

Indian film choreographers
Living people
Parsi people from Mumbai
Dance India Dance
Artists from Mumbai
1987 births